Issoire (Auvergnat: Issoire, Ussoire) is a commune in the Puy-de-Dôme department in Auvergne in central France.

Geography 
Issoire is located on the river Couze, near its confluence with the Allier,  SSE of Clermont-Ferrand on the Paris-Lyon-Méditerranée railway to Nîmes. Issoire is situated in one of the fertile plains of the Petites Limagnes—basins that follow the Allier from its source in the Massif Central to the Grande Limagne north of Clermont-Ferrand and on to the Loire.

History 
Issoire (Iciodurum) is said to have been founded by the Arverni, and in Roman times rose to some reputation for its schools. In the 5th century the Christian community established there by Stremonius in the same century was overthrown by the fury of the Vandals.

During the religious wars of the Reformation, Issoire suffered very severely. Merle, the leader of the Protestants, captured the town in 1574, and treated the inhabitants with great cruelty. The Roman Catholics retook it in 1577, and the ferocity of their retaliation may be inferred from the inscription "Ici fut Issoire" ("Here was Issoire") carved on a pillar which was raised on the site of the town. In the contest between the Leaguers and Henry IV, Issoire sustained further sieges, and never wholly regained its early prosperity.

Population

Economy 
Voxan motorcycles were manufactured at Issoire. Also, tourists often visit the village to see the church of Saint-Austremoine.

Sights 
The church of Saint-Austremoine is built on the site of an older chapel raised over the tomb of St. Austremoine (Stremonius), and affords an excellent specimen of the Romanesque architecture of Auvergne. There is also a clock tower and the museum of the philosopher's stone.

People born in Issoires 
 François Albert-Buisson
 Agénor Altaroche
 Auguste Bravard
 Antoine Duprat
 François George-Hainl
 Auguste Pomel
 Florent Sauvadet

Twin towns 
 Neumarkt in der Oberpfalz, Germany, since 1971.

See also 
Communes of the Puy-de-Dôme department

References

External links 

 Official website

Communes of Puy-de-Dôme
Subprefectures in France
Auvergne